Angelito is a Philippine daytime drama series that ran in ABS-CBN's Kapamilya Gold afternoon block and worldwide via The Filipino Channel from November 2011 to December 2012. It had two shows, the first being Batang Ama and the second being Bagong Yugto. The series starred JM de Guzman and Charee Pineda, the former playing the titular character.

Conception

Due to the rise of teenage pregnancy in the Philippines, ABS-CBN made drama shows based on lives of young parents to warn and lecture the public of the dangers of such incidents. While most of the shows presented the subject matter from the perspective of a young mother, ABS-CBN then made a plan to present a show tackling the same subject matter, but from the perspective of the father, as little was known about young fathers and their struggles. This was when ideas for Angelito were born.

JM De Guzman and Charee Pineda, who were starring in the 2011 remake of Mula sa Puso, were chosen for the roles of the main characters, Angelito and Rosalie, respectively. Also, three of their fellow cast members from the same show, Devon Seron, Sue Ramirez, and Beauty Gonzalez, joined the cast, with Gonzales appearing later. Felix Roco and Goin' Bulilit alumnus Carl John Barrameda were cast as Angelito's friends.

To prepare for the roles, De Guzman and Pineda attended a workshop exercise known as "immersion" which helped them research about teenage pregnancy and parenthood. During the exercise, the two bonded with teenage parents, who shared their stories and struggles with the actors. After more extensive research, the two began to take their roles.

Veteran actors like Al Tantay, Snooky Serna, and Elizabeth Oropesa also joined the cast. The three veterans mentored the younger cast about their roles and how they should be taken seriously. Oropesa, who had experiences being a teen parent herself. mentored De Guzman and Pineda about their roles as young parents and narrated how she raised her own child like a best friend. Oropesa also told the other young casts who take on the story that they should not only view it as "just a job" but also a "mission" to spread the word about implications and dangers of teenage pregnancy.

Shows

Batang Ama (2011)

Student-couple Angelito Santos and Rosalie Dimaano live a normal countryside life but a sudden turn of events would change their lives when Rosalie is suddenly pregnant. Dismayed by the unexpected pregnancy, both the Santoses and the Dimaanos forbid any communication between the two. As Angelito takes his child with him and runs away to the Philippine capital Manila, he strives to become a good father to his child, Jun-jun. But raising a child as a teen proves to be such a hard task, especially since Angelito is doing it on his own. Knowing the pains and ordeals of having a dysfunctional family, Angelito vows to do everything to raise Jun-jun well and find a way to reunite with Rosalie. Five years later, the ex-lovers' paths meet; Jun-jun enters childhood and Rosalie is bound to marry her rich fiancé. Will Angelito's dream of having a complete family ever come true?

Bagong Yugto (2012)

Angelito and Rosalie are now happily married and live a happy family life with their son Junjun. Meanwhile, Jenny starts a new life in Singapore only to discover that she is pregnant with Angelito's child during their relationship. Pledging not to reappear in Angelito's life again, she turns to her childhood friend Raffy for comfort, but circumstances prompt her to return to the Philippines and cross paths with the Santos family once more.

Characters

References

Philippine telenovelas
ABS-CBN original programming
2011 Philippine television series debuts
2012 Philippine television series endings